Scopula yamanei is a moth of the family Geometridae. It is found in Taiwan.

References

Moths described in 1978
yamanei
Moths of Taiwan
Taxa named by Hiroshi Inoue